Donald Gorm MacDonald of Carey was a son of James MacDonald, 6th of Dunnyveg and Agnes Campbell, daughter of Colin Campbell, 3rd Earl of Argyll. Donald obtained the barony of Carey in Antrim by patent on 18 September 1584. He was killed during the battle of Ardnaree, Ireland in 1586 against the English.

Donald had issue:
Donald Gorm Og

References
pp378–379, Rev. A. MacDonald & Rev. A. MacDonald; The Clan Donald

1586 deaths
Donald Gorm
Donald Gorm
Year of birth unknown